Antonia Kidman (born 14 July 1970) is an Australian journalist and TV presenter, and the younger sister of the actress, Nicole Kidman.

Early life
Born in Melbourne, Victoria, Australia, in 1970, Kidman is the younger daughter of Antony Kidman, a clinical psychologist. She attended Monte Sant' Angelo Mercy College in North Sydney.

Career
Kidman began her career in journalism as a researcher with the Nine Network's Today program, and later worked as a news reporter for the Newcastle based television network, NBN Television. She has had a long professional involvement with Foxtel, and in 2002 presented her own series, The Little Things, an instructional series about raising children on the W. Channel. In 2003, she released a yoga video called Antonia Fitness Yoga: The Power And Style of Ashtanga. This was followed by the series The Bigger Things in 2006.

In 2008, Kidman was awarded Favourite Female Personality at the ASTRA Awards for the second time. In 2010, she became the "ambassador" for a Chinese travel agency, Book China Online.

Kidman has co-written two books about parenting: Feeding Fussy Kids (2009) and The Simple Things: Creating an Organised Home, a Happy Family and A Life Worth Living (2012).

Community involvement
Kidman's community involvement has included the Royal Hospital for Women Foundation's Mother's Day Appeal, Randwick Mothers' Hospital, the National Breast Cancer Foundation and Taronga Zoo Foundation in Sydney.

Personal life
Kidman married Angus Hawley in February 1996. Their wedding took place in the Monte Sant' Angelo Mercy College chapel with her sister Nicole Kidman and her then-husband Tom Cruise present. Together, Kidman and Hawley have four children: two daughters, Lucia (born 1998) and Sybella (born 2007) and two sons, Hamish "Hamey" (born 2001) and James (born 2003). In May 2007, Hawley and Kidman's 11-year marriage ended. Kidman remained with the children in the family home in Greenwich, Sydney, and the couple continued to share the responsibility of parenting their children. Hawley died of a heart attack in April 2015, aged 46.

In April 2010, Kidman married Craig Marran, a Singapore-based businessman. Kidman and Marran have two sons, Nicholas (born December 2010), and Alexander Norman Kidman Marran (born December 2012).

Filmography
 Premiere (1999) ... host
 The Cover (2001) ... reporter
 The Little Things (2002) ... host and producer
 Cleo Bachelor 2002: Real Men Revealed (2002) ... host
 In Entertainment (2003) ... host and producer
 Pink Ribbon TV (2004–2005) ... host
 The Bigger Things (2006) ... host and producer
 From Here to Maternity (2006) ... host and producer

References

External links

The real Kidman pregnancy, Luke Ricketson, The Sydney Morning Herald, 6 October 2006

1970 births
Living people
Australian women journalists
Australian television presenters
Television personalities from Melbourne
Journalists from Sydney
Australian expatriates in Singapore
Australian women television presenters
People educated at Monte Sant'Angelo Mercy College